The Hoa people in Ho Chi Minh City number about 500,000. They live mainly in Cho Lon (District 5, District 6, District 10 and District 11), which is seen as a local Chinatown. The Chinese Vietnamese population accounts for just 4% of the city's population, but its members own around 30% of the city's privately held enterprises. Many of these enterprises are successful companies such as Binh Tien, Thai Tuan and Kinh Do.

Before the Fall of Saigon, Chinese Businessmen played a very important role in the economic and political life of the Republic of Vietnam, as they maintained excellent relationships with the government. After the Vietnam war, especially after the Sino-Vietnamese War in 1979, many Chinese returned to China, fled to other parts of Southeast Asia, or emigrated to the United States and Canada, along with other Western countries .

See also
Jade Emperor Pagoda
Quan Âm Pagoda
Thien Hau Temple
Hoa

External links
Chinese Vietnamese Affairs Commission in Ho Chi Minh City
Population Statistics - Chinese population
CIA -The World Fact Book

Ho Chi Minh City